Mark Thomas Emerson (born 1954) is a retired rear admiral of the United States Navy. He commanded the Naval Strike and Air Warfare Center in Fallon, Nevada from June 2006 to June 2009.

Prior to his final assignment, he served as commander of the Strike Force Training Command, Pacific. He also served as Assistant Deputy Commandant for Aviation for the United States Marine Corps.

Education
 Bachelor's degree in Business Administration from the University of Florida.
 Master's degree from the National Defense University.

References

External links

Official Profile
University of Florida article about Emerson

1954 births
Living people
Place of birth missing (living people)
University of Florida alumni
United States Naval Aviators
National Defense University alumni
Recipients of the Meritorious Service Medal (United States)
Recipients of the Legion of Merit
United States Navy rear admirals (upper half)
Recipients of the Defense Superior Service Medal